is the 5th single by Japanese girl group SKE48. It was their last release on Crown Gold. It debuted at number-one on the weekly Oricon Singles Chart and, as of February 13, 2012 (issue date), has sold 275,189 copies.

Starting from this single, only short versions are featured on SKE48 official channel, due to restrictions required by Avex.

Members

"Banzai Venus" 
 Team S: Masana Ōya, Rikako Hirata, Yuria Kizaki, Mizuki Kuwabara, Akari Suda, Kanako Hirmatsu, Shiori Takada, Jurina Matsui, Rena Matsui, Kumi Yagami
 Team KII: Anna Ishida, Shiori Ogiso, Airi Furukawa, Akane Takayanagi, Manatsu Mukaida
 Team E: Kanon Kimoto

"Ai no Kazu" 
 Team KII: Ririna Akaeda, Riho Abiru, Anna Ishida, Shiori Ogiso, Tomoko Kato, Risako Goto, Seira Sato, Mieko Sato, Akane Takayanagi, Sawako Hata, Airi Furukawa, Rina Matsumoto, Manatsu Muakida, Miki Yakata, Reika Yamada, Tomoka Wakabayashi

"Dareka no Sei ni wa Shinai" 
Akagumi
 Team S: Rumi Kato, Yukiko Kinoshita, Aki Deguchi, Rena Matsui
 Team KII: Seira Sato, Sawako Hata, Miki Yakata
 Team E: Kasumi Ueno, Madoka Umemoto, Shiori Kaneko, Minami Hara, Yukari Yamashita

"Sotsugyoushiki no Wasuremono" 
Shirogumi
 Team S: Haruka Ono, Yuka Nakanishi, Jurina Matsui
 Team KII: Riho Abiru, Tomoko Kato, Risako Goto, Mieko Sato, Rina Matsumoto, Reika Yamada, Tomoka Wakabayashi
 Team E: Erika Yamada, Yuka Nakamura

References

2011 singles
Japanese-language songs
Songs with lyrics by Yasushi Akimoto
SKE48 songs
Oricon Weekly number-one singles